Carlfred Bartholomew Broderick (April 7, 1932 – July 27, 1999) was an American psychologist, sociologist, and family therapist, a scholar of marriage and family relations at the University of Southern California, and an author of several books. He was born in Salt Lake City, Utah in 1932, and he died of cancer in 1999 in Cerritos, California at the age of 67.

Personal
Although his given name was "Carlfred" (one name) he was known as "Carl" in many circles. He and his wife Kathleen had eight children (four sons and four daughters). He was an active member of the Church of Jesus Christ of Latter-day Saints and served in the capacity of bishop, stake president, and stake patriarch.

Broderick died on July 27, 1999 at his home in Cerritos, California.

Education
Broderick attended Harvard University, earning his bachelor's degree in social relations, and graduating magna cum laude 1953. He completed his Ph.D. in child development and family relations at Cornell University in 1956 and later doing postdoctoral work at the University of Minnesota.

Academia
Broderick was an associate professor of family development at the University of Georgia from 1956 to 1960 and a professor of family relationships at Pennsylvania State University from 1960 until 1971 at which time he joined the faculty at the University of Southern California. In addition to teaching and leading the marriage and family therapy program at USC, Broderick was himself a relationship counselor. A behaviorist, he helped partners in crisis by teaching them "working tools" for real-life situations. For three decades, he also assisted colleges and school districts in North and South America, Europe, and Australia in the development of family-life and sex-education programs. Broderick chaired the USC department of sociology from 1989-1991. From 1971 through his retirement in 1997, he was executive director of USC's Marriage and Family Therapy Training Program, and director of the Human Relations Center. Upon his retirement, which was due to ill health, USC named him professor emeritus.

Public appearances
Broderick appeared as a guest on many radio and television talk shows, including ten times on The Tonight Show Starring Johnny Carson during the 1970s.

Organizations
Broderick was active in the American Sociological Association, the International Sociological Association, the American Association of Marriage and Family Therapists, the Southern California Association of Marriage and Family Therapists (president in 1974-75), the American College of Sexology, the National Council on Family Relations (served as president), and the Association of Mormon Counselors and Psychotherapists (served as president in 1982-83). In 1989 the National Council on Family Relations honored him with its Distinguished Service Award for his "outstanding contributions to the field of family therapy."

Writer
Broderick authored many books, papers and essays for different audiences. Some of his books are scholarly texts written for an audience of colleagues, others are for students, some are for individuals and couples who are trying to find happiness in their marital and family relationships. He served for 5 years as the editor of the Journal of Marriage and the Family (the publication of the National Council on Family Relations). A devout member of his religion, Carlfred wrote some books specifically for an audience of fellow church members which approach marital issues from a religious perspective.

Some of the periodicals which have featured his work include: Marriage and Family Living, The Journal of Social Issues, The Journal of Sex Research, The Journal of Marriage and the Family, The Ensign of The Church of Jesus Christ of Latter-day Saints, and Dialogue: A Journal of Mormon Thought.

A partial list of his books include:
Understanding Family Process: Basics of Family Systems Theory
One Flesh, One Heart: Putting Celestial Love into Your Temple Marriage
The Therapeutic Triangle: A Sourcebook on Marital Therapy
Dear Sister, Once Abused: A Story of Hope and Freedom from the Bondage of Childhood Sexual Abuse (written with Victoria Lynn)
My Parents Married on a Dare: And Other Favorite Essays on Life
Couples: How to Confront Problems and Maintain Loving Relationships
Marriage and the Family
The Uses of Adversity

References

USC Dept. of Sociology
Footnotes, newsletter of the American Sociological Association, November 1999

1932 births
1999 deaths
American leaders of the Church of Jesus Christ of Latter-day Saints
20th-century American psychologists
Cornell University College of Human Ecology alumni
Harvard College alumni
Patriarchs (LDS Church)
University of Southern California faculty
Latter Day Saints from California
Latter Day Saints from Georgia (U.S. state)
University of Georgia faculty
Pennsylvania State University faculty
Latter Day Saints from Pennsylvania
Latter Day Saints from Utah
American sociologists